Sralanh Khmer (lit. "Love Khmer") is a weekly Khmer-language newspaper published in Cambodia with its headquarters in Phnom Penh.

See also
List of newspapers in Cambodia

Newspapers published in Cambodia
Mass media in Phnom Penh
Khmer-language newspapers